The 3rd round 2022–23 Austrian Cup match between GAK and Sturm Graz at the  Liebenauer Stadium, Graz, took place on Wednesday 19 October 2022. Although it was the 198th city derby in history between the two teams, it was notable as it was the first in 15 years, and was marked by high fan engagement and both on and off-field incidents, despite a heavy police presence.

Background
The two teams, fierce local rivals, have not played each other in 5635 days, which amounts to 15 years. This is mostly due to the fact that after GAK's insolvency and reformation in 2012, they had to climb the league pyramid, whereas Sturm maintained their position as one of the country's top teams in the Bundesliga. By 2022 GAK however were fully professional and competing in the second tier; Sturm were defending the national vice-championship and were 2022–23 UEFA Europa League participants.

The derbies were frequent occurrences throughout history, particularly in 2000s, when GAK started to dominate their rivals for the first time, and were evening up the statistics in which Sturm were historically ahead in. The last match between the two was in 2007.

Build-up
The game was widely anticipated in the city, with city itself calling it a "Festival of football".

The Sturm fans hung a dead pig emblazoned with a "fuck GAK" sticker from a motorway bridge before the game. In retaliation, the "Grazer AK 1902 fan project" announced on social media that it will sponsor two pigs.

Police was called in from four federal states to secure the match.

Although Sturm were clear favourites in terms of sporting ability, tensions ran high before the game.

Match

On the pitch
Albian Ajeti scored the only goal of the game, which was for Sturm, in the 65th minute. The match itself was very uneventful as GAK opted for a defensive strategy.  Manprit Sarkaria hit the post in the last 15 minutes, and GAK's only dangerous chance was Michael Liendl's saved free kick in the 93rd minute, in added time.

In the stands
15400 people attended the match, in a sold-out stadium. Both sets of fans set off pyrotechnics during the match, repeatedly delaying play. Both sets of fans also burned rival club merchandise in the stands, and had numerous inflammatory banners directed at each other.

Aftermath
The fiery atmosphere was particularly noted, with the match on the pitch showing that GAK have narrowed the sporting gulf between their rivals.

It was noted that the match was much more peaceful than expected and the fiery atmosphere was the perfect backdrop to the game.

The police stated that aside from minor incidents of vandalism and physical altercations, overall the day was peaceful, much more so than they feared in the build-up to the game.

References

2022–23 in Austrian football
Sport in Graz
Football in Austria
October 2022 sports events in Europe